Americas in Transition is a 1981 American short documentary film directed by Obie Benz. It was nominated for an Academy Award for Best Documentary Short.

References

External links
Americas in Transition at Icarus Films

1981 films
1980s short documentary films
American short documentary films
1980s English-language films
1980s American films